Archibald E. McFarlane (fl. 1890s) was a Scottish footballer who made 61 appearances in the Football League for Lincoln City. He played at right back. He also played in the Midland League for Glossop North End, for Gravesend United, and in the Southern League for Sheppey United.

References

Year of birth missing
Year of death missing
Scottish footballers
Association football fullbacks
Lincoln City F.C. players
Glossop North End A.F.C. players
English Football League players
Midland Football League players
Southern Football League players
Place of death missing
Place of birth missing
19th-century births